Polina Repina (born 29 June 1990) is a Kazakhstani race walker. She competed in the women's 20 kilometres walk event at the 2016 Summer Olympics.

References

External links
 

1990 births
Living people
Kazakhstani female racewalkers
Place of birth missing (living people)
Athletes (track and field) at the 2016 Summer Olympics
Olympic athletes of Kazakhstan
20th-century Kazakhstani women
21st-century Kazakhstani women